The 1999 Fenland District Council election took place on 6 May 1999 to elect 40 members of Fenland District Council in Cambridgeshire, England. The whole council was up for election and the Conservative Party gained overall control of the council from no overall control. Previous election in 1995

Ward results
(*Sitting councillor)

Election result
One seat was vacant at the time of the election.

References

1999 English local elections
1999
20th century in Cambridgeshire